Allen McDonough (1804–1888) was an Irish jockey who won the Grand National in 1838 on Sir William.

He died in Dublin on 12 May 1888 aged 84.

References

1804 births
1888 deaths
Irish jockeys